Juan Sánchez y Duque de Estrada (1581 – 12 November 1641) was a Roman Catholic prelate who served as Bishop of Guadalajara (1636–1641) in Mexico.

Biography
Juan Sánchez y Duque de Estrada was born in Santa Cruz de la Jara, Spain.
On 21 July 1636, he was nominated by King Philip IV and confirmed by Pope Urban VIII as Bishop of Guadalajara, Mexico.  On 23 September 1637, he was installed in the bishopric, where he served until his death on 12 November 1641.

References

External links
 (for Chronology of Bishops)
 (for Chronology of Bishops)
 Concilios provinciales de México Google Books

1581 births
1641 deaths
17th-century Roman Catholic bishops in Mexico
Bishops appointed by Pope Urban VIII